Alphonse De Vreese (5 January 1922 – 18 March 2011) was a French racing cyclist. He rode in the 1947 and 1948 Tour de France.

References

External links

1922 births
2011 deaths
French male cyclists